Potamia is a former municipality in Evrytania, Greece. Since the 2011 local government reform it is part of the municipality Karpenisi, of which it is a municipal unit. The municipal unit has an area of 126.192 km2. The population in 2011 was 856. The seat of the municipality was in Megalo Chorio.

References

Populated places in Evrytania